Karel Plášek (born October 16, 1973) is a Czech former professional ice hockey player, who last played for HC Kohouti Česká Třebová in the Krajské hokejové přebory in 2019-20 season.

Plášek previously played for in the Czech Extraliga for HC Pardubice, HC Znojemští Orli, HC Vítkovice, HC Plzeň, HC Přerov, Draci Šumperk and IHC Písek.

Career statistics

References

External links

1973 births
Living people
Czech ice hockey forwards
IHC Písek players
HC Plzeň players
HC Dynamo Pardubice players
Hokej Šumperk 2003 players
Sportspeople from Zlín
HC ZUBR Přerov players